Conal McNamara is a paralympic athlete from Ireland competing mainly in category T13 sprint events.

Conal competed in the 200m and 400m for class T13 athletes in the 2004 Summer Paralympics winning the silver in the longer sprint.

References

Paralympic athletes of Ireland
Athletes (track and field) at the 2004 Summer Paralympics
Paralympic silver medalists for Ireland
Living people
Medalists at the 2004 Summer Paralympics
Year of birth missing (living people)
Paralympic medalists in athletics (track and field)
Irish male sprinters